Chryseobacterium scophthalmum  is a Gram-negative and rod-shaped bacteria from the genus of Chryseobacterium which has been isolated from the gills of a turbot (Scophthalmus maximus) in Scotland. Chryseobacterium scophthalmum produces flexirubin.

References

Further reading

External links
Type strain of Chryseobacterium scophthalmum at BacDive -  the Bacterial Diversity Metadatabase

scophthalmum
Bacteria described in 1994